Eddie Martin may refer to:

 Kwasi Jones Martin, English musician, songwriter and producer, also known as Eddie Martin
 Eddie Martin (boxer) (1903–1968), American bantamweight boxer